A regional election took place in the former region of Centre (now Centre-Val de Loire) on 21 March and 28 March 2004, along with all other regions. Michel Sapin (PS) was re-elected President of the Council (from 1998 to 2000 and from 2004 to 2007).

Results

References 

Centre, 2004
Centre